Nehemiah 6 is the sixth chapter of the Book of Nehemiah in the Old Testament of the Christian Bible, or the 16th chapter of the book of Ezra-Nehemiah in the Hebrew Bible, which treats the book of Ezra and the book of Nehemiah as one book. Jewish tradition states that Ezra is the author of Ezra-Nehemiah as well as the Book of Chronicles, but modern scholars generally accept that a compiler from the 5th century BCE (the so-called "Chronicler") is the final author of these books. This chapter records the continuing opposition to Nehemiah from sources both external (Sanballat, Tobiah, and their allies) and internal (the prophetess Noadiah and the rest of the prophets).

Text

The original text of this chapter is in  Hebrew language. This chapter is divided into 19 verses.

Textual witnesses
Some early manuscripts containing the text of this chapter in Hebrew are of the Masoretic Text, which includes Codex Leningradensis (1008).

There is also a translation into Koine Greek known as the Septuagint, made in the last few centuries BCE. Extant ancient manuscripts of the Septuagint version include Codex Vaticanus (B; B; 4th century), Codex Sinaiticus (S; BHK: S; 4th century), and Codex Alexandrinus (A; A; 5th century).

The pretense of peace (6:1-4)
As a leader, Nehemiah holds his motives and conduct blameless, but at the same time, he must understand and deal wisely with the opposition 'who seek to compromise God's work'.

Verses 1–2
 Now it happened when Sanballat, Tobiah, Geshem the Arab, and the rest of our enemies heard that I had rebuilt the wall, and that there were no breaks left in it (though at that time I had not hung the doors in the gates),  that Sanballat and Geshem sent to me, saying, "Come, let us meet together among the villages in the plain of Ono." But they thought to do me harm.
Tobiah is described as an Ammonite in 
"Geshem": or "Gashmu" (see verse 6).
"Among the villages": or "in Kephirim", exact location unknown.

The trap of intimidation (6:5-9)
Sanballat hoped that Nehemiah would follow the logical action against the rumors of threats, the way he and his allies would do, that is, 'given to ambition, opportunistic maneuvering, and dedicated to self-preservation', but Nehemiah 'refused to become distracted by the ploy of politics' and kept his devotion to God.

Verse 5
Then Sanballat sent his servant to me as before, the fifth time, with an open letter in his hand.
Sanballat sent his fifth letter as an open letter, because he is 'well aware of the possibility that popular sentiment will stand behind a claim to restore an independent Judah', and uses it to launch an accusation that Nehemiah is sponsoring prophetic supports (indicating the importance of prophetic authority in Ezra–Nehemiah).

Verse 6In it was written, "It is reported among the nations, and Geshem also says it, that you and the Jews intend to rebel; that is why you are building the wall. And according to these reports you wish to become their king."
"Geshem": written in Hebrew as "Gashmu".

The lure of safety (6:10-14)
In this section, Nehemiah remembers that the will of God is eternal and has primacy over any individual.

Verse 10
Then I went to the house of Shemaiah son of Delaiah, the son of Mehetabel. He was confined to his home. He said, "Let’s set up a time to meet in the house of God, within the temple. Let’s close the doors of the temple, for they are coming to kill you. It will surely be at night that they will come to kill you."

Continued opposition (6:15-19)
The establishment of fortifications does not provide full security, as continued opposition remains in place; dangers can always threaten the community of faith, but ... the godly character of the people is the greatest defense against the threats.

Verse 15
So the wall was finished in the twenty and fifth day of the month Elul, in fifty and two days.
"Elul": The month in Hebrew calendar, which is the same as the Assyrian month U-lu-lu and corresponds to the end of August and beginning of September in the Gregorian calendar.
"Fifty and two days" would cover a period from July 25 to September 15, which may correspond to the 25th of Elul. The Jerusalem Bible suggests that the completion date may have been early October, 445 BC.

Verse 17
Moreover in those days the nobles of Judah sent many letters unto Tobiah, and the letters of Tobiah came unto them.
"The nobles" (from Hebrew:)  were the leaders of the Jews; they continued to have correspondence with Tobiah, apparently because there were intermarriages with Tobiah's family. Tobiah continues to be a threat as he is closely related to the people with whom Nehemiah must deal later (see Nehemiah 13).

Verse 19
Moreover, they kept reporting to me his good deeds and then telling him what I said. And Tobiah sent letters to intimidate me.
The nobles of Judah acted as intermediaries: they "endeavoured to convince Nehemiah that Tobiah’s professions of goodwill were sincere ... and on the other hand they communicated to Tobiah all that Nehemiah said and did". Anglican commentator H. E. Ryle suggests that their aim was to supply Tobiah with "material for charges against Nehemiah to be made before the Persian king, or for slanders to the Jewish people".

See also
Jerusalem
Prophetess
Related Bible parts: Nehemiah 2, Nehemiah 13

Notes

References

Sources

Further reading
Blenkinsopp, Joseph, "Ezra-Nehemiah: A Commentary" (Eerdmans, 1988)
Blenkinsopp, Joseph, "Judaism, the first phase" (Eerdmans, 2009)
Coggins, R.J., "The Books of Ezra and Nehemiah" (Cambridge University Press, 1976)
Ecker, Ronald L., "Ezra and Nehemiah", Ecker's Biblical Web Pages, 2007.
Grabbe, L.L., "Ezra-Nehemiah" (Routledge, 1998)
Grabbe, L.L., "A history of the Jews and Judaism in the Second Temple Period, Volume 1" (T&T Clark, 2004)
Throntveit, Mark A. (1992) "Ezra-Nehemiah". John Knox Press

External links
 Jewish translations:
 Nechemiah - Nehemiah - Chapter 6 (Judaica Press) translation [with Rashi's commentary] at Chabad.org
 Christian translations:
 Online Bible at GospelHall.org (ESV, KJV, Darby, American Standard Version, Bible in Basic English)
 Book of Nehemiah Chapter 6. Bible Gateway

06